The palm warbler (Setophaga palmarum) is a small songbird of the New World warbler family.

Description 
Measurements:

 Length: 
 Weight: 
 Wingspan:

Taxonomy 
The species comprises two distinct subspecies that may merit specific status.

"Yellow palm warbler" or "eastern palm warbler" (S. p. hypochrysea) of the eastern third of the breeding range has brownish-olive upper parts and thoroughly yellow underparts with bold rufous breast and flank streaking. It migrates later in the fall than its western counterpart.

"Brown palm warbler" or "western palm warbler" (S. p. palmarum) inhabits the remaining western two-thirds of the breeding range. It has much less yellow below, with less colorful streaking, and cold grayish-brown upper parts.

Distribution
Palm warblers breed in open coniferous bogs and edge east of the Continental Divide, across Canada and the northeastern United States.

These birds migrate to the southeastern United States, the Yucatán Peninsula, islands of the Caribbean, and eastern Nicaragua south to Panama to winter. They are one of the earlier migrants to return to their breeding grounds in the spring, often completing their migration almost two months before most other warblers. Unlike most Setophaga species, the Palm warbler's winter range includes much of the Atlantic coast of North America, extending as far north as southern Nova Scotia. Every year since 1900 the Palm warbler has been observed during Christmas Bird Count activities in Massachusetts, and consistently since 1958 in Nova Scotia. For the interval 1966-2015 the Palm warbler population increased throughout much of its northernmost breeding range.

Palm warbler has been recorded as a vagrant to Iceland.

Behavior 
Palm warbler nests take the form of an open cup, usually situated on or near the ground in an open area.

Palm warblers forage on the ground much more than other warblers, sometimes flying to catch insects. These birds mainly eat insects and berries. Their constant tail bobbing is an identifying characteristic. Kirtland's, prairie, and palm warblers are the only Setophaga species that incessantly bob their tails.

The song of this bird is a monotonous buzzy trill. The call is a sharp chek.

Gallery

References

External links

Palm warbler - Dendroica palmarum - USGS Patuxent Bird Identification InfoCenter
Palm warbler species account - Cornell Lab of Ornithology
Stamps (for British Virgin Islands) at bird-stamps.org
 
 

palm warbler
Birds of Canada
Native birds of the Northeastern United States
Birds of the Caribbean
Birds of the Dominican Republic
Birds of Central America
palm warbler
palm warbler